Gurbanova is a feminine surname of Azerbaijani origin. The masculine surname counterpart would be Gurbanov. People with this name include:
 Anna Gurbanova (born 1986), Azerbaijani rhythmic gymnast
 Hokuma Gurbanova (1913–1988), Azerbaijani and Soviet theatre and film actress
 Nargiz Gurbanova (born 1975), Azerbaijani diplomat, serving as the Ambassador of Azerbaijan to Poland

Surnames of Asian origin